Myra Arboretum (26 acres), also called Larimore Arboretum, is located on the south branch of the Turtle River in Larimore, North Dakota. The arboretum is located within the Larimore Dam Recreation Area.

The Arboretum contains over 500 trees.

See also
List of botanical gardens in the United States

External links
Grand Forks County: Myra Arboretum, includes list of species
Grand Forks County: Larimore Dam Recreation Area

Arboreta in North Dakota
Botanical gardens in North Dakota
Greater Grand Forks
Protected areas of Grand Forks County, North Dakota